Naga king may refer to 

Nagaraja, a leader of the Nāga, half-human and half snake beings in Indian religion and mythology
King of the dynasty of the Nagas of Padmavati in ancient India